Rachel Fitz (born 4 May 1995) is a Maltese sprinter. She competed in the 60 metres event at the 2014 IAAF World Indoor Championships.

References

1995 births
Living people
Maltese female sprinters
Place of birth missing (living people)
Athletes (track and field) at the 2014 Commonwealth Games
Commonwealth Games competitors for Malta
European Games competitors for Malta
Athletes (track and field) at the 2015 European Games